Umeda may refer to

 Umeda, district in Kita-ku, Osaka, Japan
 Umeda language
 Umeda Station, railway station in Kita-ku, Osaka, Japan

Surnames 
 Ayaka Umeda, Japanese idol singer (AKB48)
 Erika Umeda, Japanese idol singer (Cute)
 Kota Umeda
 Masahiko Umeda, Japanese wrestler
 Mochio Umeda, Japanese management consultant
 Naoya Umeda, Japanese football player
 Ryuuji Umeda, Japanese billiards player
 Takashi Umeda, Japanese football player

Japanese-language surnames